Röhr may refer to:

 Röhr (river), a river in Germany
 Röhr (surname), a surname of German origin